The Scottish Engineering Hall of Fame honours "those engineers from, or closely associated with, Scotland who have achieved, or deserve to achieve, greatness", as selected by an independent panel representing Scottish engineering institutions, academies, museums and archiving organisations.

The Scottish Engineering Hall of Fame was established by the Institution of Engineers and Shipbuilders in Scotland in 2011.
New inductees are announced each year at the IESIS James Watt Dinner.

Inductees
Douglas Anderson
William Arrol
John Logie Baird
George Balfour
Alexander Graham Bell
James Blyth
David Boyle
Thomas Graham Brown
Sir George Bruce
William Kinninmond Burton
Craig Clark
Victoria Drummond
Henry Dyer
David Elder
John Elder
Francis Elgar
Sir William Fairbairn
Mary (Molly) Fergusson
George Forbes
Hugh Gill
James Goodfellow
Graeme Haldane
Naeem Hussain
Alexander Carnegie Kirk
James Clerk Maxwell
Gordon McConnell
Elijah McCoy
Andrew Meikle
Sir Duncan Michael
Sir Donald Miller
William Murdoch
Robert Napier
Anne Neville
James Newlands
Percy Pilcher
Dorothée Pullinger
William Rankine
John Rennie
Ian Ritchie
John Scott Russell
Stephen Salter
Anne Gillespie Shaw
Robert Stevenson (civil engineer)
Robert Stirling
Thomas Telford
Robert William Thomson
William Thomson, Lord Kelvin
Robert Watson-Watt
James Watt
William Douglas Weir
James Young

References

External links
Official site

Science and technology halls of fame

Science and technology in Scotland
Engineering
2011 establishments in Scotland
2011 in science